Garry Kevin Langrish Thompson (born 24 November 1980) is an English football coach and former player who was last manager of Bradford (Park Avenue).

Playing career
Born in Kendal, Cumbria, Thompson scored Morecambe's first goal in the Conference play-off Final against Exeter City in May 2007.

In January 2008, Morecambe turned down a £10,000 offer from Bradford City for Thompson. Instead he agreed to sign for Scunthorpe United on a three-year contract on 27 May 2008 on a free transfer, joining on 1 July.

He was released by the club in May 2012.
Thompson signed a one-year contract with Bradford City on 4 July 2012. He made his debut on 11 August in the League Cup during a 1–0 win against Notts County. He then made his league debut a week later against Gillingham. He made his home debut on 21 August in a 1–0 win against Fleetwood Town, coming on as a substitute for Zavon Hines. On 28 August, he scored his first goal for the club, scoring an injury-time winner in a 2–1 win in the League Cup against Watford. On 11 December, he helped Bradford to the semi-finals of the League Cup by scoring against Arsenal. He scored his first league goal for the club on 26 December in a 2–1 win at home to Accrington Stanley. On 2 May 2013, he scored in the first leg of the play-off semi-final against Burton Albion. In the final, he assisted goals from both Nahki Wells and James Hanson as Bradford beat Northampton Town 3–0 and secured promotion to League One.

On 23 July 2014, Garry Thompson signed for Notts County. After one season with County, he joined Wycombe Wanderers on a two-year deal. He scored in the 83rd minute of Wycombe's FA Cup fourth round match against Tottenham Hotspur on 28 January 2017 after heading in Myles Weston's cross to give Wycombe a 3–2 lead, although Wycombe went on to lose the match 4–3. At the end of the 2016–17 season, Thompson left Wycombe Wanderers after his contract was not renewed.

Thompson re-signed for Morecambe on 28 June 2017, after 9 years away from the club. He had remained in close contact with his former teammate Jim Bentley, who is the current manager of Morecambe. Thompson made his second competitive debut in the opening game of the new season, a 2–1 win over Cheltenham Town. Thompson scored both goals to complete the comeback, including a last minute winner.

In January 2019, he was released by Morecambe and joined Northern Premier League club Workington.

After a short spell with Penrith FC, 39-year old Thompson decided to hangs up his boots on 9 December 2019.

Coaching career
In May 2019 he became player-manager of Bradford (Park Avenue). However, he was sacked after just two league games, having lost both of them 5–0, on 8 August 2019.

Career statistics

References

External links

1980 births
Living people
Sportspeople from Kendal
Footballers from Cumbria
English footballers
Association football wingers
Morecambe F.C. players
Scunthorpe United F.C. players
Bradford City A.F.C. players
Notts County F.C. players
English Football League players
National League (English football) players
Wycombe Wanderers F.C. players
Workington A.F.C. players
Penrith F.C. players
Bradford (Park Avenue) A.F.C. managers
National League (English football) managers
English football managers